

List of countries

Middle Africa